Cheer Perfection is an American reality television series that debuted on December 19, 2012, on TLC. TLC announced on February 6, 2013, that it ordered an eight episode second season, which premiered on August 28, 2013. Alisha Dunlap, Cassadee, R.D. Dunlap, Bonnie Crow, Alana, Ann Robinson, Torann and Robinson's husband Torey originally appeared on Toddlers & Tiaras. Dunlap owns Perfection Studios, which appeared in episodes of Toddlers & Tiaras.

After Andrea Clevenger, who appeared on Cheer Perfection, was arrested on charges relating to rape of a 13-year-old boy, TLC released a statement that the show had already been canceled and no repeats will be aired.

Synopsis
Cheer Perfection follows a group of young cheerleaders at Cheer Time Revolution, located in Sherwood, Arkansas, as they endure the world of competitive cheerleading.

Episodes

Series overview

Season 1 (2012–13)

Season 2 (2013)

Reception
David Hinckley of New York Daily News said the parents are not an endearing bunch. Brian Lowry of Variety said the show isn't original. Verne Gay of Newsday said the show is dull, trivial and never, ever outrageous. Melissa Camacho of Common Sense Media gave the show 2 stars out of 5.

References

External links

2010s American reality television series
2012 American television series debuts
2013 American television series endings
Cheerleading television series
English-language television shows
Sherwood, Arkansas
Television series by Authentic Entertainment
Television series about children
Television shows set in Arkansas
TLC (TV network) original programming